The Celebes crested macaque (Macaca nigra), also known as the crested black macaque, Sulawesi crested macaque, or the black ape, is an Old World monkey that lives in the Tangkoko reserve in the northeastern tip of the Indonesian island of Sulawesi (Celebes), as well as on smaller neighboring islands.

Description
Locally known as yaki or wolai, its skin and hairless face is, with the exception of some white hair in the shoulder range, entirely jet black. Unusual for a primate, it has striking reddish-brown eyes. The long muzzle with high cheeks and the long hair tuft, or crest, at the top of the head are remarkable features. Its life expectancy is estimated at 15–20 years in the wild.

Ecology
The Celebes crested macaque is a diurnal rain forest dweller. This macaque is primarily terrestrial, spending more than 60% of its day on the ground foraging for food and socializing, while sleeping and searching for food in the trees.

The Celebes crested macaque is frugivorous, with 70% of its diet consisting of fruits. It also consumes leaves, buds, seeds, fungus, small birds and bird eggs, insects (such as beetles and caterpillars) worms, snails and the occasional small lizard or frog.

Group behavior
It lives typically in groups of five to twenty-five animals, and occasionally in groups of up to seventy-five animals. Smaller groups have only a single adult male, while larger groups have up to four adult males. However, adult females always outnumber adult males by about 4:1. Young adult males are forced to leave their birth group upon maturity, sometimes forming bachelor groups before seeking a connection to an existing adult mixed-sex group. Communication consists of various sounds and gestures; such as the presentation of the long canine teeth while grimacing, a clearly threatening gesture.

The Celebes crested macaque is promiscuous, with both males and females mating multiple times with multiple partners. The receptivity of the females is clearly indicated by an extreme tumescence (swelling) and redness of their buttocks which, in contrast to the black skin color, is particularly noticeable. The gestation time is 174 days, and the birth of the usually single offspring happens in the spring when food is more plentiful. Young animals are nursed for approximately one year, becoming fully mature in three to four years, females somewhat sooner than males.

Human interactions

Because it devastates crops and fields, the Celebes crested macaque is hunted as a pest. It is also hunted to provide bushmeat. Clearing the rain forests further threatens its survival. Its situation on the small neighbouring islands of Sulawesi (such as Bacan) is somewhat better, since these have a low human population. The total population of the macaque on Sulawesi is estimated at 4,000–6,000, while a booming population of up to 100,000 monkeys is found on Bacan.

A series of survey trips to Sulawesi and the Minahasa forest area were made in 2004–2009 by Vicki Melfi, who is  EEP studbook holder for these macaques, based at Paignton Zoo / the Whitley Wildlife Conservation Trust. She has been monitoring population density, which has declined from over 300 individuals per square kilometre in 1980 to 20 to 60 individuals today. A conservation programme called Selamatkan Yaki—or "Save the Yaki", as this macaque is known in the local language—was launched with local partners and other conservation groups from Thailand, Germany and the Wildlife Conservation Society (based in the United States). Both Newquay Zoo and Paignton Zoo are among a number of mostly European zoos which hold ex-situ breeding populations of this animal.

Since 2006, the Macaca Nigra Project has been studying the biology and promoting the conservation of this species. The project, a collaboration between the German Primate Center and the Bogor Agricultural Institute, is run by Antje Engelhardt and located in the Tangkoko reserve, home of the biggest crested macaque population remaining in the species' original distribution range.

Nevertheless, despite being critically endangered, crested black macaque are still unprotected outside of Tangkoko reserve and they are regularly hunted and slaughtered. They are easily caught and killed as they have no   fear of humans. Crested black macaque is considered a delicacy by local residents.

In 2013, wildlife cameraman Colin Stafford-Johnson spent time on Sulawesi, filming the monkeys at close quarters for a BBC documentary entitled "Meet the monkeys".

In 2014, considerable discussion of copyright issues was generated by a "selfie" photograph taken by a Celebes crested macaque.

Gallery

See also
 Barbary ape

References

External links

ARKive - images and movies of the crested black macaque (Macaca nigra)
 Primate Info Net Macaca nigra Factsheet
 Macaca Nigra Project 

Celebes crested macaque
Endemic fauna of Indonesia
Mammals of Sulawesi
Primates of Indonesia
Critically endangered fauna of Asia
Celebes crested macaque
Taxa named by Anselme Gaëtan Desmarest